The 60th General Assembly of Prince Edward Island was in session from January 3, 1997, to March 21, 2000. The Progressive Conservative Party led by Pat Binns formed the government. In 1996, the 16 dual-member districts were changed to 27 single-member districts. Thus the Assemblymen and Councillors were renamed MLAs

Wilbur MacDonald was elected speaker.

There were three sessions of the 60th General Assembly:

Members

Notes:

References
 Election results for the Prince Edward Island Legislative Assembly, 1996-11-18
 Mars-Proietti, Laura Canadian Parliamentary Guide, 2008 

Terms of the General Assembly of Prince Edward Island
1997 establishments in Prince Edward Island
2000 disestablishments in Prince Edward Island